Gerda Blees (born 1985) is a Dutch writer. She published her first book in 2017, a short story collection titled Aan doodgaan dachten we niet (We Didn’t Think About Dying). In 2018, she published her first volume of poetry, Dwaallichten (Wandering Lights).

Blees won the European Union Prize for Literature in 2021 for her debut novel WIJ ZIJN LICHT (WE ARE LIGHT).

She studied fine arts at the Gerrit Rietveld Academie in Amsterdam, and now lives in Haarlem.

References

Dutch writers
1985 births
Living people